K154 or K-154 may refer to:

K-154 (Kansas highway), a former state highway in Kansas
Russian submarine Tigr (K-154), a Russian submarine